Heinrich Wolf (20 October 1875  –  December 1943) was an Austrian journalist and chess master.

Biography
In 1897, he tied for 5-7th in Berlin (Géza Maróczy won). In 1900 he tied for 7-10th in Munich (the 12th DSB Congress, Maroczy, Carl Schlechter and Harry Pillsbury won). In 1902, he tied for 5-7th in the Monte Carlo chess tournament (Maroczy won), tied for 5-6th in Hannover (13th DSB–Congress, Dawid Janowski won), and won, jointly with Janowski, in Vienna (Pentagonal). Wolf drew a match with Ossip Bernstein (+1 –1 =6).

In 1903, he took 7th in Monte Carlo (Siegbert Tarrasch won). In 1904 he tied for 8-9th in Coburg (14th DSB–Congress, Curt von Bardeleben, Schlechter and Rudolf Swiderski won), and tied for 4-5th in Vienna (Schlechter won). In 1905 he took 10th in Ostend (Maroczy won), tied for 7-10th in Barmen (Janowski and Maroczy won), and took 2nd, behind Schlechter, in Vienna. In 1906, he tied for 6-7th in Nuremberg (15th DSB–Congress, Frank Marshall won). In 1907, he tied for 9-11th in Vienna (Jacques Mieses won), and took 10th in the Carlsbad 1907 chess tournament (Akiba Rubinstein won). In 1908, he tied for 9-12th in Düsseldorf (16th DSB–Congress, Marshall won). 

In 1908, Emanuel Lasker engaged Simon Alapin and Wolf as seconds (first introduction of seconds in world championship play) for the WCC match against Tarrasch, held in Düsseldorf and Munich.
 
After World War I, he tied for 6-7th at Piešťany (Pistyan) 1922 (Efim Bogoljubow won), tied for 8-10th at Teplice-Šanov (Teplitz-Schönau) 1922 (Richard Réti and Rudolf Spielmann won), and took 3rd at Vienna 1922 (Rubinstein won), took 14th in the Carlsbad 1923 chess tournament (Alexander Alekhine, Bogoljubov and Maroczy won), and tied for 12-13th at Maehrisch-Ostrau Ostrava 1923 (Emanuel Lasker won).

In December 1941 Wolf was deported to the Riga ghetto where he was murdered.

References

1875 births
1943 deaths
Austrian Jews
Austrian chess players
Jewish chess players
Austrian Jews who died in the Holocaust
Austrian civilians killed in World War II
People who died in the Riga Ghetto